MT Sidsel Knutsen is a Norwegian oil tanker built in 1993.

Design
The Sidsel Knutsen is designed for the shipping of oil products, including gasoline, plain crude oil, and biodiesel. The Sidsel Knutsen also has a sistership, the Turid Knutsen, which is also a tanker, and was built in 1993. The home port of both ships is Haugesund, Norway. Both ships are capable of hauling 5,000 tons of cargo and are commonly loaded with over 1,000,000 gallons of various liquids. The Sidsel Knutsen makes frequent trips from Norway to the United States to pick up loads of biodiesel and deliver them to European ports. The company that the Sidsel Knutsen gets her biodiesel from Lake Erie Biofuels in Erie, Pennsylvania. It is a major producer of biofuel in the United States.

Accidents

2001

The Sidsel Knutsen is perhaps best known for an incident that occurred in the Detroit River in October 2001. A mail boat, J. W. Westcott II, capsized shortly after 0700 on an October morning as she was delivering a pilot to Sidsel Knutsen. Westcott’s captain, Catherine Nasiatka, 48, and deckhand David Lewis, 50, were killed in the accident. Two Canadian pilots who were aboard Westcott swam to safety in the fast-moving river that separates Detroit from Windsor, Ontario. The Sidsel Knutsen was unharmed by the incident because of her large size and steel hull.

2010
On 3 August 2010 the Sidesel Knusten lost engine power after sustaining an engine fire when traveling north along the St. Clair River. The ship hit a buoy and swung around and headed for the seawall, the ship dropped its anchor before making contact and was only 10 feet from the seawall.  This occurred near The Voyageur restaurant during operational hours.  No injuries were reported.  The ship was repaired and was back in service on 8 August 2010.

References

External links
Knutsen O.A.S. Shipping. 
locate the Sidsel Knutsen

Oil tankers
1993 ships